Henry Martin (c. 1864–1951), also known as Harry Martin, was a British socialist.

Martin was one of the most notable of the impossibilists in the Social Democratic Federation (being expelled in April 1904), and helped found the Socialist Party of Great Britain later that year. A member of its first Executive Committee (1904–1905), Martin was expelled on 8 April 1905 owing to his joining an unemployed rights association. He rejoined the Party on 6 November 1906 and left again, only to rejoin on 19 June 1908. He was then a speaker for the Party (1909–1911), an Executive Committee member (1911) and briefly Lambeth branch secretary (1911) before finally resigning over the WB of Upton Park affair in 1911. The issue at stake was essentially whether socialist MPs should vote for reforms, the dissidents taking the stance that they never should. He was a member of the anti-reform Provisional Committee of 1911 and subsequently long-term organiser of the Socialist Propaganda League (an SPGB split-off). He died early in 1951, aged 87.

See also
Socialist Propaganda League

References
Obituary in May 1951 Socialist Standard
Socialist Party of Great Britain 1904–1913 membership register
Justice

Socialist Party of Great Britain members
Social Democratic Federation members
1864 births
1951 deaths